Accenture Tower refers to a building in one of various U.S. cities:

500 West Madison, Chicago
333 South Seventh Street, Minneapolis